Białas, Bialas, or Biallas is a Polish-language surname. The Polish word białas means "white-haired man" and comes from the adjective biały ("white"). The surname is the same for males and females. It may refer to:

 Arthur Bialas (1930–2012), German footballer
 Czesław Białas (1931–1991), Polish weightlifter
 Dave Bialas (born 1954), American baseball player and coach
 Edmund Białas (1919–1991), Polish footballer
 Günter Bialas (1907–1995), German composer
 Hans Biallas (1918–2009), German footballer
 Kamil Białas (born 1991), Polish figure skater
 Magdalena Białas (born 1962), Polish swimmer
 Sebastian Białas (born 1990), Polish footballer
 Stefan Białas (born 1948), Polish footballer
 Valentine Bialas (1903–1965), American speed skater
 Wolfram Bialas (1935–1998), German chess player

References

See also
 

Polish-language surnames